Tylöskog is a forested area in southeast Sweden, intersected by many faults, running from east to west between the agricultural plains of the counties of Närke and Östergötland.  Together with Tiveden to its west and Kolmården to its east, it constituted the border between the Swedes in Svealand and the Geats in Götaland. Beginning in the 11th century, iron was smelted there using water power.

References

External links
 Google Maps Satellite Image

Forests of Sweden
Närke
Östergötland
Geography of Östergötland County